Kerron Tyre Johnson Jr. (born December 14, 1990) is an American professional basketball player who last played for Spójnia Stargard of the Polish Basketball League (PLK). He played college basketball for Belmont University before playing professionally in New Zealand, Germany, France, Poland, Italy and Israel.

High school career
Johnson attended Madison Academy in Madison, Alabama. In his senior year, he averaged 24 points, six assists, five rebounds and two steals per game for the 29-6 Mustangs.

College career
Johnson was part of the Belmont University basketball team from 2009 to 2013. In 2009–10, he averaged 20.1 minutes, 6.1 points, 2.1 rebounds, 2.8 assists and 1.0 steals per game. In 2010–11, he averaged 18.2 minutes, 7.9 points, 1.5 rebounds, 2.7 assists and 2.0 steals per game. In his junior year in 2011–12, he averaged 28.6 minutes, 13.8 points, 3.1 rebounds, 5.2 assists and 1.4 steals per game. In his senior year in 2012–13, he averaged 30.0 minutes, 14.0 points, 3.2 rebounds, 4.8 assists and 1.7 steals per game.

Professional career
On August 12, 2013, Johnson signed a multi-year deal with the New Zealand Breakers of the National Basketball League. On April 3, 2014, he was released by the Breakers following the conclusion of the 2013–14 season. In 28 games for the Breakers, he averaged 12.6 points, 2.8 rebounds, 4.3 assists and 1.2 steals per game.

On September 19, 2014, Johnson signed with MHP Riesen Ludwigsburg of Germany for the 2014–15 season. In 34 games for Ludwigsburg, he averaged 14.2 points, 2.7 rebounds, 3.8 assists and 1.1 steals per game.

On July 24, 2015, Johnson signed with SPO Rouen Basket of France for the 2015–16 season.

On August 1, 2017, Johnson re-signed with MHP Riesen Ludwigsburg for the 2017–18 season.

On July 14, 2018, Johnson signed with the Italian club Pistoia Basket 2000. In 18 games played for Pistoia, he averaged 12.1 points, 3.1 rebounds and 3.7 assists per game.

On February 21, 2019, Johnson parted ways with Pistoia to join Hapoel Be'er Sheva of the Israeli Premier League for the rest of the season. In 16 games played for Be'er Sheva, he averaged 14.3 points, 2.6 rebounds, 4.8 assists and 1.3 steals per game. Johnson helped Be'er Sheva reach the 2019 Israeli League Playoffs, where they eventually were eliminated by Hapoel Jerusalem in the Quarterfinals.

On September 8, 2019, Johnson signed a one-year deal with Cluj of the Romanian Liga Națională. Johnson averaged 12.7 points and 5.1 assists per game in the Romanian league.

On July 23, 2020, he has signed with BC Enisey of the VTB United League.

On October 22, 2021, he has signed with s.Oliver Würzburg of the German Basketball Bundesliga. Johnson averaged 8.2 points, 3.0 assists and 1.2 rebounds per game. On January 13, 2022, he has signed with Spójnia Stargard of the Polish Basketball League (PLK).

Personal
Johnson is the son of Kerry and Natalie Johnson, and has three siblings, Kalonda, Nyla and Kerryon. Kerryon played college football at Auburn and now plays professionally for the San Francisco 49ers.

References

External links
Belmont Bruins bio
RealGM profile
NBL stats

1990 births
Living people
American expatriate basketball people in France
American expatriate basketball people in Germany
American expatriate basketball people in Israel
American expatriate basketball people in Italy
American expatriate basketball people in New Zealand
American expatriate basketball people in Poland
American expatriate basketball people in Russia
American men's basketball players
Basketball players from Alabama
Basketball players from Tallahassee, Florida
BC Enisey players
Belmont Bruins men's basketball players
Hapoel Be'er Sheva B.C. players
Lega Basket Serie A players
MKS Dąbrowa Górnicza (basketball) players
New Zealand Breakers players
People from Madison, Alabama
Pistoia Basket 2000 players
Point guards
Riesen Ludwigsburg players
S.Oliver Würzburg players
Spójnia Stargard players